Andrés Gutiérrez Vera (born 8 July 1993) is a Mexican professional boxer. He challenged for the WBA featherweight title in 2017.

Professional career
On 7 August 2010 Gutiérrez beat veteran Carlos Aboyte by first round K.O. In July 2017, he was expected to face former WBA featherweight champion Carl Frampton but the fight was cancelled due to Gutierrez slipping in his shower. Frampton had previously missed weight. Gutiérrez lost to Abner Mares in October 2017.

Personal life
Gutiérrez has a family boxing gym in Querétaro, Mexico named "Los 4 Jaguares".

References

External links

Mexican male boxers
Boxers from Querétaro
Sportspeople from Querétaro City
Super-bantamweight boxers
1993 births
Living people